Dmytrivka is an urban-type settlement in Nizhyn Raion, Chernihiv Oblast, Ukraine. It hosts the administration of Dmytrivka settlement hromada, one of the hromadas of Ukraine. Population is 

Dmytrivka is located at the right bank of the Romen River.

History
It was a settlement in the Konotopsky Uyezd of the Chernigov Governorate of the Russian Empire. 

During World War II it was occupied by Axis troops from September 14, 1941 until September 14, 1943. Dmytrovka obtained the status of Urban-type settlement in 1958.

In January 1989, the population was 3929

Until 18 July 2020, Dmytrivka belonged to Bakhmach Raion. The raion was abolished in July 2020 as part of the administrative reform of Ukraine, which reduced the number of raions of Chernihiv Oblast to five. The area of Bakhmach Raion was merged into Nizhyn Raion.

Transportation
A railway station is located here, on the railway connecting Bakhmach and Zavodske via Romny.

Dmytrivka is connected by roads with Bakhmach (with further access to the Highway M02), Ichnia, and Romny.

References

Konotopsky Uyezd
Urban-type settlements in Nizhyn Raion